Cioppino (from  ) is a fish stew originating in San Francisco, California. It is an Italian-American dish and is related to various regional fish soups and stews of Italian cuisine.

Description
Cioppino is traditionally made from the catch of the day, which in San Francisco is typically a combination of Dungeness crab, clams, shrimp, scallops, squid, mussels and fish, all sourced from the ocean, in this case the Pacific. The seafood is then combined with fresh tomatoes in a wine sauce.

The dish can be served with toasted bread, either local sourdough or French bread. The bread acts as a starch, similar to a pasta, and is dipped into the sauce.

History
Cioppino was developed in the late 1800s by Italian immigrants who fished off Meiggs Wharf and lived in the North Beach neighborhood of San Francisco, many from the port city of Genoa. When a fisherman came back empty-handed, they would walk around with a pot to the other fishermen asking them to chip in whatever they could. What ever ended up in the pot became their "cioppino". The fishermen that chipped in expected the same treatment if they came back empty-handed in the future. It later became a staple as Italian restaurants proliferated in San Francisco.

The name comes from ciuppin (also spelled ciupin) which is the name of a classic soup from the Italian region Liguria, similar in flavor to cioppino but with less tomato and using Mediterranean seafood cooked to the point that it falls apart.

The dish also shares its origin with other regional Italian variations of seafood stew similar to cioppin, including cacciucco from Tuscany, brodetto di pesce from Abruzzo and others. Similar dishes can be found in coastal regions throughout the Mediterranean, from Portugal to Greece. Examples of these include suquet de peix from Catalan-speaking regions and bouillabaisse from Provence.

The earliest printed description of cioppino is from a 1901 recipe in The San Francisco Call, though the stew is called "chespini.” "Cioppino" first appears in 1906 in The Refugee's Cookbook, a fundraising effort to benefit San Franciscans displaced by the 1906 earthquake and fire.

Presentation
Generally the seafood is cooked in broth and served in the shell, including the crab, which is often served halved or quartered. It therefore requires special utensils, typically a crab fork and cracker. Depending on the restaurant, it may be accompanied by a bib to prevent food stains on clothing, a damp napkin and a second bowl for the shells. A variation, commonly called "lazy man's cioppino", is served with shells pre-cracked or removed.

Other
Cioppino became the title for a recurring lecture series at a banquet at the Urbino Summer School of Paleoclimatology (USSP) when it was realised that Italians had never heard of the dish but that its roots lay with Italian-Americans for mixing and stirring things from land and sea.

See also
 Bouillabaisse
 List of regional dishes of the United States
 List of seafood dishes
 List of soups
 List of stews

References

External links
 Gianni's North Beach Video plus text, presenting the dish as a Christmas Eve stew

American stews
Cuisine of the San Francisco Bay Area
Fish stews
Italian-American cuisine
Seafood dishes